Jhon Cley Jesus Silva (born 9 March 1994), commonly known as Jhon Cley, is a Brazilian footballer who plays as a midfielder for Cong An Ha Noi FC.

On 29 June 2019, Jhon Cley signed a contract with Marítimo.

References

External links
Jhon Cley at playmakerstats.com (English version of ogol.com.br)

1994 births
Living people
Brazilian footballers
Brazilian expatriate footballers
Campeonato Brasileiro Série A players
Campeonato Brasileiro Série B players
Campeonato Brasileiro Série C players
Saudi Professional League players
Primeira Liga players
CR Vasco da Gama players
Al-Qadsiah FC players
Goiás Esporte Clube players
Centro Sportivo Alagoano players
C.S. Marítimo players
Brusque Futebol Clube players
Figueirense FC players
Brazilian expatriate sportspeople in Saudi Arabia
Brazilian expatriate sportspeople in Portugal
Expatriate footballers in Saudi Arabia
Expatriate footballers in Portugal
Association football midfielders
Footballers from Brasília